Tullio Pane (16 June 1930 in Naples – 3 October 2001 in Civitavecchia) was an Italian singer. In 1955 he won the Sanremo Music Festival in partnership with Claudio Villa, with the song "Buongiorno tristezza".

References 

Italian pop singers
Italian folk singers
Sanremo Music Festival winners
1930 births
2001 deaths
Singers from Naples
20th-century Italian male singers